The Portugal national under-21 football team is the national under-21 football team of Portugal and is controlled by the Portuguese Football Federation (FPF). They are nicknamed "Esperanças." Esperança means hope, thus they are Portugal's hopes for the future.

Following the realignment of UEFA's youth competitions in 1976, the Portuguese under-21 team was formed. Until 1994, the team had a rather poor record, failing to qualify for each of the first eight UEFA under-21 Championships. Since 1994, the team has improved its record greatly, qualifying for five of the next seven tournaments, including the 2006 finals.

Having qualified for the 2006 tournament finals, UEFA announced that Portugal would host the finals in May and June. From 2007 onwards, host nations will be announced before the qualification stage and will not need to qualify.

Competitive record

UEFA European Under-21 Championship

*Denotes draws include knockout matches decided on penalty kicks.
**Gold background colour indicates that the tournament was won.
***Red border color indicates tournament was held on home soil.

Player records

Top appearances

Note: Club(s) represents the clubs during the player's time in the Under-21s.

Top goalscorers

Note: Club(s) represents the clubs during the player's time in the Under-21s.

Current squad
 The following players were called up for the friendly matches.
 Match dates: 18 and 22 November 2022
 Opposition:  and Caps and goals correct as of:' 22 November 2022, after the match against 

Head coaches

{| class="wikitable" style="text-align: left"
|-
!rowspan=2| Manager
!rowspan=2| Period
!colspan=8| Record
|-
!
!
!
!
!
!
!
!
|-
|  José Alberto Costa
| –1993

|-
|  Nelo Vingada
| 1994–1996

|-
|  Jesualdo Ferreira
| 1996–2000

|-
|  Agostinho Oliveira
| 2000–2002

|-
|  Rui Caçador
| 2002

|-
|  José Romão
| 2002–2004

|-
|  Rui Caçador
| 2004

|-
|  Agostinho Oliveira
| 2004–2006

|-
|  José Couceiro
| 2006–2007

|-
|  Rui Caçador
| 2007–2009

|-
|  Oceano Cruz
| 2009–2010

|-
|  Rui Jorge
| 2010–present''

Honours
 UEFA Under-21 European Championship runners-up: 1994, 2015, 2021

See also
 Golden generation

References

External links
 Official site 
 UEFA Under-21 website Contains full results archive
 The Rec.Sport.Soccer Statistics Foundation Contains full record of U-21/U-23 Championships.

 
European national under-21 association football teams